Bigelow Hollow State Park is public recreation area in the town of Union, Connecticut, in the Quinebaug Highlands. The state park's  border Nipmuck State Forest on the east and west and Mashapaug Lake on the north. The park and forest are located in a large hollow or depression approximately 700' below the surrounding ridgelines. They are managed by the Connecticut Department of Energy and Environmental Protection.

Surroundings
The state park was carved out of Nipmuck State Forest by the State Park and Forest Commission in 1949.

Activities and amenities
The park has been described as "[r]emote by Connecticut standards," where a map and orienteering skills may be useful as the park is mostly evergreen at lower elevations and trails can be lost in the thick forest density. A boat launch and picnicking facilities are located on  Bigelow Pond at the entrance to the park and on  Mashapaug Lake, which is found near the end of the park's main road.

Fishing is offered in summer and winter (ice fishing). The streams, ponds and lakes feature stocked as well as native trout, small and large mouth bass and pickerel. Backcountry camping is allowed in Nipmuck State Forest. Snowmobiling trails begin in the state park and continue into the state forest.

References

External links

Bigelow Hollow State Park Connecticut Department of Energy and Environmental Protection
Bigelow Hollow State Park Map Connecticut Department of Energy and Environmental Protection

State parks of Connecticut
State parks of the Appalachians
Parks in Tolland County, Connecticut
Protected areas established in 1949
Union, Connecticut
Nipmuck State Forest
1949 establishments in Connecticut